This was the first edition of the tournament.

Lloyd Glasspool and Harri Heliövaara won the title after defeating Romain Arneodo and Albano Olivetti 7–6(7–5), 6–7(5–7), [12–10] in the final.

Seeds

Draw

References

External links
 Main draw

Open International de Tennis de Roanne - Doubles